Jason McCartney (born September 3, 1973 in Honolulu) is an American former professional road racing cyclist, who rode professionally between 1999 and 2013 for seven different teams. His 2004 Tour de Georgia stage win led to his being named the "North American rider of the year" by VeloNews Magazine. He represented the USA Olympic team in the road racing event in 2004 and 2008.  Jason is also a graduate of the National Outdoor  Leadership School.  He lives in Coralville, Iowa.

Major results

2001
 1st Overall stage  Gateway Cup
2002
 1st 1 stage  International Tour d'Toona
 1st 1 stage  Tour of Kansas City
 1st  Wapello to Burlington Road Race
2003
 1st Overall and 2 stages  Joe Martin Memorial Stage Race
 1st  Snake Alley Criterium
 1st Stage 1  Gateway Cup
 1st  Stage 4  Gateway Cup
2004
 1st King of the Mountains Classification  Tour de Georgia
 1st Stage 4
 1st  U.S. Olympic Trials Road Race
 1st King of the Mountains Competition T-Mobile International of San Francisco
 1st Overall  Tri-Peaks Challenge
 1st  Snake Alley Criterium
2005
 1st King of the Mountains Classification  Barclay's Global Investor Grand Prix of San Francisco
 3rd  Barclay's Global Investor Grand Prix of San Francisco
2006
 1st King of the Mountains Classification  Tour de Georgia
2007
 1st, Stage 14 Vuelta a España

 3rd Overall  Tour of California
2008
 1st King of the Mountains Classification  Tour de Georgia
2009
 1st  King of the Mountains Classification, Tour of California
2012
1st Stage 6 Volta a Portugal

References

External links 

 Discovery Channel Pro Cycling Team: Biography
 

 National Outdoor Leadership School's The Leader Online: The Young and the Adventurous

1973 births
Living people
American male cyclists
American Vuelta a España stage winners
Cyclists at the 2004 Summer Olympics
Cyclists at the 2008 Summer Olympics
Olympic cyclists of the United States